The 2004–05 ISU Junior Grand Prix was the eighth season of the ISU Junior Grand Prix, a series of international junior level competitions organized by the International Skating Union. It was the junior-level complement to the Grand Prix of Figure Skating, which was for senior-level skaters. Skaters competed in the disciplines of men's singles, ladies' singles, pair skating, and ice dance. The top skaters from the series met at the Junior Grand Prix Final.

Competitions
The locations of the JGP events change yearly. In the 2004–05 season, the series was composed of the following events:

Junior Grand Prix Final qualifiers
The following skaters qualified for the 2004–05 Junior Grand Prix Final, in order of qualification.

Kiira Korpi, who missed the third alternate position by one spot, was given the host wildcard spot to the Junior Grand Prix Final. She placed 4th at the Final.

Medalists

Men

Ladies

Pairs

Ice dance

Medal table

References

External links
 
 
 
 
 
 
 
 
 
 2004–05 Results

ISU Junior Grand Prix
2004 in figure skating
2004 in youth sport
2005 in youth sport